Mount Ayliff, officially eMaxesibeni, is a small town in the Eastern Cape province of South Africa, near that province's border with KwaZulu-Natal. In the census of 2011, its population was recorded as being 5,367 people, of whom 98% described themselves as "Black African", and 91.5% spoke Xhosa as their first language.

Mount Ayliff is located in the Umzimvubu Local Municipality, which is part of the Alfred Nzo District Municipality; it is the location of the headquarters of the latter.

Xesibeland, the traditional region of the Xesibe people, was located around Mount Ayliff. The Xesibe was led by Chief Jojo; Jojo today is the royal family and still the leading family in EmaXesibeni.

Geography 
Mount Ayliff is located in a mountainous valley, hence the word "Mount". It is located just 26 km south-west of the KwaZulu-Natal border and is also located 34 km south of Kokstad and 144 km north-east of Mthatha. The nearest city to Mount Ayliff is Durban which is 283 km north-east of the town.

1999 tornado 
On 18 January 1999 a number of tornadoes hit the town and surrounding areas.  Twenty five people were killed and over 500 were injured; the tornadoes destroyed around 95% of the homes in the area leaving most people homeless making it the most destructive tornado recorded in South Africa.

Mount Ayliff Christmas Day Massacre 

The town was the scene of a mass shooting incident between a group of Mpeni and Nokhatshile men on Christmas day 2020 in-which at least 7 people died and at least 6 were injured. Following a search for suspects lead by the South African National Defence Force seven people, all injured in the incident, were arrested. The incident was the result of a conflict between competing mini-bus taxi operators in the area.

References

Populated places in the Umzimvubu Local Municipality